Mulga is a town in western Jefferson County, Alabama, United States. It incorporated in 1947. This town is north from the Birmingham suburb of Pleasant Grove. It includes the community of Bayview. At its 2010 census the population was 836, down from its peak population of 973 in 2000. Its communities were damaged by an F5 tornado on April 8, 1998. The town's name is possibly derived from the Creek word omalga meaning "all".

Geography
Mulga is located at  (33.548891, -86.977254).

Demographics

2020 census

As of the 2020 United States census, there were 784 people, 359 households, and 237 families residing in the town.

2000 census
As of the census of 2000, there were 973 people, 390 households, and 276 families residing in the town. The racial makeup of the town was 85.10% White, 13.16% Black or African American, 0.62% Native American, 0.31% Asian, and 0.82% from two or more races. 0.10% of the population were Hispanic or Latino of any race.

There were 390 households, out of which 32.8% had children under the age of 18 living with them, 51.0% were married couples living together, 16.4% had a female householder with no husband present, and 29.2% were non-families. 27.2% of all households were made up of individuals, and 17.2% had someone living alone who was 65 years of age or older. The average household size was 2.49 and the average family size was 3.04.

In the town, the population was spread out, with 24.4% under the age of 18, 9.4% from 18 to 24, 28.1% from 25 to 44, 21.4% from 45 to 64, and 16.9% who were 65 years of age or older. The median age was 37 years. For every 100 females, there were 85.7 males. For every 100 females age 18 and over, there were 79.1 males.

The median income for a household in the town was $36,500, and the median income for a family was $41,382. Males had a median income of $31,438 versus $23,750 for females. The per capita income for the town was $16,622. About 8.6% of families and 10.8% of the population were below the poverty line, including 13.5% of those under age 18 and 14.0% of those age 65 or over.

References

External links

Historic American Engineering Record (HAER) documentation, filed under Birmingham, Jefferson County, AL:

Birmingham metropolitan area, Alabama
Historic American Engineering Record in Alabama
Towns in Jefferson County, Alabama
Towns in Alabama
Alabama placenames of Native American origin